Planet Sheen is an American CGI-animated television series. It is the third and final installment in the Jimmy Neutron franchise, the second and final spin-off television series of the film Jimmy Neutron: Boy Genius, and a spin-off sequel to The Adventures of Jimmy Neutron, Boy Genius. The series was picked up for 26 episodes by Nickelodeon for its first and only season. Jeffrey Garcia returns as the voice of Sheen, and Bob Joles and Rob Paulsen are the voices of Nesmith and Doppy.  The series was originally animated by C.O.R.E. in Toronto, but animation production moved to Bardel Entertainment in Vancouver after C.O.R.E closed down. At that time Chris Neuhahn took over as Supervising Producer. Planet Sheen premiered on Nickelodeon on October 2, 2010 (along with T.U.F.F. Puppy) in the United States. The series aired its final new episode on February 15, 2013.

Plot
Following the events of the original series, one day, after sneaking into Jimmy's laboratory and finding his new rocket ship, Sheen accidentally blasts himself into outer space when he disobeys Jimmy's warning note, "Sheen, do not push this button", and pushes the button Jimmy mentioned in his note. After soaring through the cosmos for an unspecified amount of time, Sheen eventually crashes onto a distant alien planet four trillion and one light-years away from Earth known as "Zeenu" where he meets the planet's emperor, who firmly believes Sheen is a supernatural creature that will bring joy.

Much of the show is centered around Sheen fixing his rocket so he could go home, working for the Emperor as his new supreme royal adviser, and annoying an evil sorcerer named Dorkus with his antics and wild destruction. Furious that Sheen not only destroyed his home when he first arrived on the planet but also took his job from him, Dorkus and his minion Pinter scheme to destroy him but fail at every turn.

While on Zeenu, Sheen makes many new friends, some of which include: Doppy Doppweiler, a green slug-like creature who resembles Carl; Nesmith, an intelligent chimpanzee from Earth who excels in subjects such as math and engineering; the Emperor's daughter Princess Oomlout, who develops a crush on Sheen that he does not appreciate; Aseefa, a girl who becomes Sheen's crush and knows how to yodel; and Chock Chock, Aseefa's pet Choctow who's regarded as the most feared and dangerous creature on Zeenu.

Characters 

Sheen (voiced by Jeffrey Garcia) 
Nesmith (voiced by Bob Joles)
Doppy (voiced by Rob Paulsen)
Dorkus (voiced by Jeff Bennett)
Pinter (voiced by Thomas Lennon)
Aseefa (voiced by Soleil Moon Frye)
Emperor (voiced by Fred Tatasciore)
Princess OomLout (voiced by Candi Milo)

Production
During production of The Adventures of Jimmy Neutron, Boy Genius, much of DNA Productions staff were pitching new titles for development if the show were to end. From this, Keith Alcorn and Mike Gasaway developed "Red Acres", which was set to be a CGI series about an adult astronaut who finds a planet filled with dimwitted aliens. The two (alongside Ben Gilberg) pitched the idea to Nickelodeon (at their parent company Viacom's headquarters in New York City), who reportedly loved the concept, yet refused to greenlight it on the stance of it breaking the network's rule of the main character not being a child. They then subsequently pitched the idea to Kids WB, Cartoon Network, and Disney, yet got rejected each time.

They then redeveloped their main character so that instead of focusing on an adult, they focus on Carl and Sheen from Jimmy Neutron. However, after presenting their idea, an executive for Nick said that the series shouldn't focus on Carl, just Sheen. Though it was hard for the team to fully accept, they reached a compromise by introducing an alien character who looked and acted just like Carl.

After pitching the idea to Nickelodeon Animation in LA, they loved the show so much, that it was put into immediate development, with Steven Banks joining the crew to help develop the show even further.

Broadcast
Planet Sheen premiered in the United States on Nickelodeon on October 2, 2010, and continued to air there until August 18, 2011. The series was moved to Nicktoons on May 4, 2012, to air the remaining episodes until February 15, 2013. Nickelodeon Canada aired a sneak peek of the series on January 2, 2011, which was followed by an official premiere on January 5, 2011. On July 21, 2011, the series debuted in Australia and New Zealand on Nickelodeon.  Planet Sheen also aired on Nickelodeon in the UK and Ireland, with a sneak peek on May 2, 2011, and an official premiere aired on June 6, 2011.

Episodes

Home media

Main
 The Complete Series (September 25, 2014)
 The Complete Series (Reprint) (February 9, 2021)

Episodes on other DVDs
 Fanboy & Chum Chum (May 24, 2011, includes pilot episode on bonus features)

Reception
Emily Ashby of Common Sense Media gave the series 3 out of 5 stars; saying that, "While there isn't any content that's overtly problematic, there's equally little of any real value to kids."

References

External links

 
 

2010 American television series debuts
2013 American television series endings
2010s American animated television series
2010s American comic science fiction television series
2010s Nickelodeon original programming
Animated television shows based on films
American animated television spin-offs
American children's animated comic science fiction television series
American children's animated science fantasy television series
American children's animated space adventure television series
American computer-animated television series
Animated television series about children
Animated television series about extraterrestrial life
English-language television shows
Television series set on fictional planets
Television series created by Steve Oedekerk
Nicktoons
The Adventures of Jimmy Neutron, Boy Genius